Michael Dubruiel (November 16, 1958 – February 3, 2009) was a Roman Catholic author and speaker. Born in Keene, New Hampshire, Dubruiel served for four years in the U.S. Army before studying for a BA in philosophy from the now-closed St. Meinrad College and an MA in Christian Spirituality from Creighton University. Like his wife, Amy Welborn, Dubruiel became a widely read Catholic blogger while also writing several books.

Works written by Dubruiel include:

 How To Get The Most Out Of The Eucharist
 The How-To Book of the Mass
 The Church's Most Powerful Novenas
 The Power of the Cross
 Praying in the Presence of Our Lord with Fulton J. Sheen
 Praying the Rosary
 A Pocket Guide to the Mass
 A Pocket Guide to Confession
 Pope John Paul's Biblical Way of the Cross

References

External links
 Michael Dubruiel's official site

1958 births
2009 deaths
American Roman Catholic religious writers
Creighton University alumni
Laicized Roman Catholic priests
People from Keene, New Hampshire
Catholics from New Hampshire